Ameril Umbra Kato (18 May 1946 – 14 April 2015) was the founder of the Bangsamoro Islamic Freedom Fighters (BIFF), a group which seceded from the Moro Islamic Liberation Front (MILF). He joined the MILF in or around 1985, after he graduated from Imam Muhammad bin Saud Islamic University in Riyadh, Saudi Arabia. Umbra Kato was the Philippines' most wanted man, though due to his membership in MILF he was not hunted by the military. A warrant of arrest was filed against him alongside other BIFF members by the Philippine National Police. The Armed Forces of the Philippines, with the MILF, launched Operation Darkhorse in a bid to arrest him in January 2014.

Kato reportedly died on 14 April 2015 of a heart attack. BIFF spokesperson Abu Misry Mama confirmed his death after he was informed by Kato's son that he died at 2:00 am due to complications from pneumonia. He was reported to have died in Barangay Kateman in Guindulungan, Maguindanao, but this was denied by the barangay chairman.

References

External links 
 Profile of Umbra Kato
 abs-cbn: MILF: Umbra Kato’s group not acceptable, February 16, 2011 (retrieved May 7, 2011)

1946 births
2015 deaths
Filipino Muslims
Filipino Islamists
People from Maguindanao
Imam Muhammad ibn Saud Islamic University alumni
Deaths from pneumonia in the Philippines